Aziz Ouattara Mohammed (born 4 January 2001) is an Ivorian professional footballer who plays as a centre-back or central midfielder for Belgian First Division A club Genk.

Early life
Ouattara was born in the Ivorian capital Abidjan. At age three, Ouattara moved to his grandmother in the neighboring country Ghana, where he mostly grew up. At age 15, he moved back to Abidjan and started to play football in the youth academy of local club ASEC Mimosas.

Club career

Hammarby IF
On 23 May 2019, Ouattara joined Swedish side Hammarby IF on loan, alongside ASEC teammate Bayéré Junior Loué, after a successful trial. Their chief scout Mikael Hjelmberg compared his playing style to that of compatriot Odilon Kossounou, who just had been sold for a club record fee to Club Brugge. Both Ouattara and Loué completed a permanent transfer to Hammarby IF on 30 December 2019, signing four-year deals with the club. In 2020, Ouattara went on loan to Hammarby's affiliated club IK Frej in Ettan, Sweden's third tier. He played 26 league games, and scored twice, as the side finished 9th in the table. 

On 1 April 2021, Ouattara made his competitive debut for Hammarby IF against Trelleborgs FF in the quarter-final of the Svenska Cupen, the main domestic cup. His side won 3–2 after extra time, with Ouattara coming on as a half-time substitute. Three days later, Ouattara started and scored the only goal in a 1–0 win against rivals Djurgårdens IF in the semi-final. On 30 May 2021, Ouattara won the 2020–21 Svenska Cupen with Hammarby IF, through a 5–4 win on penalties (0–0 after full-time) against BK Häcken in the final. He featured in four games as the side reached the play-off round of the 2021–22 UEFA Europa Conference League, after eliminating Maribor (4–1 on aggregate) and FK Čukarički (6–4 on aggregate), where the club was knocked out by Basel (4–4 on aggregate) after a penalty shoot-out, although Ouattara scored in the second leg at home. Following his performances in 2021, Ouattara reportedly attracted interest from other clubs, such as Rennes and Bordeaux in the French Ligue 1, as well as from Al Ain in the UAE Pro League.

Genk
On 7 January 2022, Ouattara completed a transfer to Belgian First Division A club Genk, signing a contract until the summer of 2026. The transfer fee was reportedly set at around 30 million SEK (€2.9 million at that time).

Career statistics

Club

Honours

Club
Hammarby IF
 Svenska Cupen: 2020–21

References

External links
 

2001 births
Living people
Association football central defenders
Ivorian footballers
Hammarby Fotboll players
IK Frej players
K.R.C. Genk players
Ettan Fotboll players
Allsvenskan players
Belgian Pro League players
Ivorian expatriate footballers
Ivorian expatriate sportspeople in Sweden
Expatriate footballers in Sweden
Ivorian expatriate sportspeople in Belgium
Expatriate footballers in Belgium